Straw dogs or Grass dogs, figures of dogs made out of straw, were used as ceremonial objects in ancient China, as a substitute for the sacrifice of living dogs.  has been used figuratively to refer to anything discarded after use.

Use as a metaphor

Tao Te Ching
Chapter 5 of the Tao Te Ching makes use of the phrase  to compare living beings to straw dogs. This metaphor is used to explain the non-humanity of Heaven and Earth:

However, some translators prefer to interpret this phrase as two separate words, "straw" and "dogs", rather than together, as "straw dogs".

Su Zhe's commentary on the verse explains: "Heaven and Earth are not partial. They do not kill living things out of cruelty or give them birth out of kindness. We do the same when we make straw dogs to use in sacrifices. We dress them up and put them on the altar, but not because we love them. And when the ceremony is over, we throw them into the street, but not because we hate them."

Zhuangzi
Another Taoist text, the Zhuangzi provides a more detailed description for the treatment of the straw dogs in its 14th chapter, "The Turnings of Heaven":

The image of the straw dogs is again used to criticise Confucianism, as the Zhuangzi goes on to compare Confucius, in his insistence upon the ancient rites, to a fool who attempts to reconstitute the trampled straw dogs, "replace them in the box or basket", and "wrap them up with embroidered cloths".

Popular culture
 The 1971 film Straw Dogs draws its title from the Tao Te Ching.
 The 2011 remake Straw Dogs refers to straw dogs.
 The band Something Corporate has a song titled "Straw Dog" on their 2002 album Leaving Through the Window. It includes the line "Hey, now, the straw dog's out in the street."
 Professor John N. Gray's book of essays is titled Straw Dogs (John Gray, Straw Dogs: Thoughts on Humans and Other Animals, Granta Books 2002)
 Guided by Voices song "Strawdogs"
 Stiff Little Fingers song "Straw Dogs"
 Richard Siken poem "Straw House, Straw Dog"
 Manic Street Preachers song Afterending “Trojan horses and straw dogs”

See also
 Paper tiger

Notes

References

Chinese culture
Chinese words and phrases